Nurdaulet Zhumagali (born 28 January 1999) is a Kazakhstani Paralympic swimmer. He won the bronze medal in the men's 100 metre breaststroke SB13 event at the 2020 Summer Paralympics held in Tokyo, Japan.

He won the silver medal in the men's 100 metre breaststroke SB13 event at the 2022 World Para Swimming Championships held in Madeira.

References

Living people
1999 births
People from Taraz
Swimmers at the 2020 Summer Paralympics
Paralympic bronze medalists for Kazakhstan
Paralympic medalists in swimming
Kazakhstani male breaststroke swimmers
Paralympic swimmers of Kazakhstan
Medalists at the 2020 Summer Paralympics
Medalists at the World Para Swimming Championships
S13-classified Paralympic swimmers
21st-century Kazakhstani people